Maria Sophia Schellhammer (née Conring; baptised 9 September 1647  – 1719) was a German writer and cook, best remembered for her cookbook Die wol unterwiesene Köchinn, also known as the Brandenburgisches Kochbuch, published in 1692. She further wrote a book about confectionary in 1700 titled Der wohl-unterwiesenen Köchinn Zufälliger Confect-Tisch.

References 

1719 deaths
German chefs
17th-century German women writers
18th-century German women writers
People from Helmstedt
1647 births
German gastronomes